Naxibacter is a genus of bacteria in the Oxalobacteraceae family.

References

Burkholderiales
Bacteria genera